Xincheng Township could refer to:

Mainland China
Xincheng Township, Lintan County, Gansu
Xincheng Township, Qingshui County, Gansu
Xincheng Township, Zhenyuan County, Gansu
Xincheng Township, Songyuan, in Ningjiang District, Songyuan, Jilin
Xincheng Township, Jingbian County, Shaanxi

Taiwan
Xincheng, Hualien, township in Hualien City

See also
Xincheng (disambiguation)

Township name disambiguation pages